Ten Mile Junction LRT station was an elevated Light Rail Transit (LRT) station on the Bukit Panjang LRT line in Choa Chu Kang, Singapore that was in operation between 6 November 1999 and 13 January 2019. This LRT station was the only one that was air conditioned, inside a building (Junction 10), had full height platform screen doors, faregates on the same level as the platform, and only one track. The two-car configuration was not deployed for the service and it provided a 20-minute frequency, which was lower than the other LRT stations.

History

The station and the building was located in Junction 10 (formerly known as Ten Mile Junction), which was named after the distance of the junction located outside it as calculated from the city along Bukit Timah Road and Upper Bukit Timah Road.

This station was closed from 10 December 2010 to 30 December 2011 for retrofitting works due to the closure and redevelopment of Ten Mile Junction shopping mall (now known as Junction 10), marking the first time an LRT or MRT station to be closed in Singapore after opening. Bukit Panjang LRT Service C, which operates from Ten Mile Junction, was also suspended during that time. On 30 December 2011, this station was reopened for revenue service, coinciding with the soft launch of the newly redeveloped Junction 10 shopping mall. Despite the mall's renovation, the old station's interior design was retained.

The station was closed permanently from 13 January 2019 due to low demand. The closure of the station also led to the cessation of Bukit Panjang LRT Service C, formerly running from this station and looping in Bukit Panjang town via Senja. The vacated station will therefore be converted to Ten Mile Junction Depot Extension. This was also the first ever MRT and LRT station in Singapore's history to be permanently closed and removed from operations.

Station layout
The station was the only one on the Bukit Panjang LRT line with three levels – other stations only have two. Despite this, Bukit Panjang and Choa Chu Kang each have a mezzanine level.

It was also linked to the Ten Mile Junction Depot, which access was restricted at level U3. This was the only station that had one side platform in the Bukit Panjang LRT line.

References

External links

Railway stations in Singapore opened in 1999
Choa Chu Kang
LRT stations of Bukit Panjang LRT Line
Railway stations closed in 2019
Light Rail Transit (Singapore) stations
2019 disestablishments in Singapore